Talos No. 2 is an outdoor 1959–1977 bronze sculpture created by the American artist James Lee Hansen. It is located in the Transit Mall of downtown Portland, Oregon, in the United States.

Description

James Lee Hansen's bronze sculpture Talos No. 2 is installed at the intersection of Southwest 6th Avenue and Stark Street on the Portland Transit Mall. The abstract statue depicts Talos, the giant man of bronze in Greek mythology who protected Crete from invaders. It is part of a series of works by Hansen called "Talos"; Talos, which is part of the Guardian series, was installed on Fulton Mall in downtown Fresno, California in 1961, and the bronze Talos No. 3 (1984) is part of the collection of the Seattle Art Museum.

Talos is shown with three legs; other discernible body parts include a head, rib cage and hips. The work is administered by the Regional Arts & Culture Council (RACC), which has described the work as an "abstracted human figure on three legs with multiple short appendages on the torso and shoulders". Furthmore, the agency offers the following description of Talos and the sculpture he inspired:

RACC's public art collection manager has said Talos No. 2 is an "excellent" example of abstract sculpture from the 1970s.

History

Talos No. 2 was completed during 1959–1977, and was funded by TriMet as part of its Percent for Art program, as well as the United States Department of Transportation, for $10,000. When the Transit Mall was completed in 1977, the sculpture was located in the block of 6th Avenue between Morrison and Alder streets.  It was valued at $70,000 when the Transit Mall was reconstructed beginning in 2007. Along with nine other sculptures, it was placed in storage during that reconstruction, and when the mall reopened in 2009, Talos No. 2 was reinstalled, but at a different location—on 6th Avenue just north of its intersection with Stark Street.

The sculpture broke into several pieces in July 2015 after being toppled from its pedestal. Police took a suspect into custody, who was later charged with criminal mischief for damaging the statue. RACC staff thought the sculpture was irreparable when they first saw its pieces in the Portland Police Bureau Evidence Room. However, it was later determined repairs were possible because many of the breaks were along weld lines.

In September 2015, Portland Tribune reported that RACC was soliciting donations to offset repair costs, which were estimated at $3,750 by Portland's Cascadia Art Conservation Center. The repairs were partially financed by the city's insurance policy, which had a $2,500 deductible. RACC's public art collection manager said, "We're very hopeful the statue can be repaired and returned to the Transit Mall in a few months." Repairs included positioning five pieces, welding, and a chemical treatment, completed by Robert Krueger and welders from Art & Design Works over three months. Reinstallation occurred on October 30, 2015.

Hansen's Winter Rider No. 2 (2003) was installed on the Transit Mall, at the intersection of Southwest Sixth Avenue and Taylor Street, in February 2010. It was previously installed at the Public Service Building.

See also
 1959 in art
 1977 in art
 Greek mythology in western art and literature
 The Falconer (Hansen), a sculpture by Hansen formerly installed at the University of Oregon

References

External links
 Talos, Downtown Fresno Partnership
 Talos No. 2 at the Public Art Archive
 TriMet MAX Green Line Public Art Guide (PDF, pgs. 2, 37), TriMet

1977 establishments in Oregon
1977 sculptures
Abstract sculptures in Oregon
Bronze sculptures in Oregon
Ancient Greece in art and culture
Legendary creatures in popular culture
Outdoor sculptures in Portland, Oregon
Sculptures by James Lee Hansen
Sculptures of classical mythology
Sculptures on the MAX Green Line
Southwest Portland, Oregon
Statues in Portland, Oregon